Joseph Alcazar (15 June 1911 – 4 April 1979) was a football striker. He was part of the France squad at the FIFA World Cup 1934.

Titles

Olympique de Marseille
 Coupe de France: 1934
 Coupe de France runner-up : 1934

References
Profile
Stats

1911 births
1979 deaths
Footballers from Oran
1934 FIFA World Cup players
French footballers
France international footballers
Association football forwards
Olympique de Marseille players
OGC Nice players
Ligue 1 players
Pays d'Aix FC players
AC Avignonnais players
Olympique Lillois players